Daniel de Marbelle (also known as Dion de Marbelle) (1818-1903) was an American gospel songwriter, soldier, musician, and early circus clown who wrote When They Ring Those Golden Bells (also known as "There's a Land Beyond the River").

Marbelle was born in Leon in France (or Spain) in 1817 or 1818 and emigrated to the United States as a young child. Early in life, Marbelle worked on a whaling ship and eventually joined the United States Navy. During the Mexican-American War in 1847, Marbelle served as a drummer with a New York company. In 1858 he married Ann Sitts in McHenry, Illinois.  During the American Civil War he served as a drum major in the 6th Michigan Volunteer Infantry Regiment.  After the War, Marbelle travelled as an actor and musician and was the first clown in the James Anthony Bailey circus, before it became part of the P.T. Barnum Circus. Marbelle also ran his own circus for a period, and assisted Buffalo Bill Cody in setting up his Wild West Show. Marbelle also sang in a Methodist choir in Elgin, Illinois where he had a brass band and called figures at square dances. Marbelle was purportedly cheated out of the copyright of his 1887 hit, "When They Ring Those Golden Bells," and the copyright was acquired by the John Church Company. Marbelle died penniless in 1903 in Aledo, Illinois at the Soldier's Home and was buried in the Bluff City Cemetery in Elgin, Illinois.

References

1818 births
1903 deaths

Immigrants to the United States
Songwriters from Illinois
Methodists from Illinois
American people in whaling
People of Michigan in the American Civil War
American military personnel of the Mexican–American War
Union Army soldiers
American clowns
Drummers
[